Paul Leland Haworth (1876–1936) was an American author, educator, explorer and politician, born at West Newton, Indiana.

Books
 The Hayes-Tilden Disputed Presidential Election of 1876 (1906) 
 The Path of Glory (1911)
 America in Ferment (1915)
 George Washington, Farmer (1915) (reissued in 1925 as George Washington, Country Gentleman)
 The United States in Our Own Times, 1865–1920 (revised, 1924)
 Trail Makers of the Northwest (1921)

References

External links
 
 

1876 births
1936 deaths
American political writers
American male non-fiction writers
Columbia University faculty
Indiana University Bloomington alumni
Indiana University faculty
Members of the Indiana House of Representatives
People from Marion County, Indiana
American historians
Historians from Indiana